Aleksandr Alexandrovich Shabanov (5 November 1935 – 8 January 2023) was a Russian chemist and politician. A member of the Communist Party of the Russian Federation, he served in the State Duma from 1995 to 2003.

Shabanov died in Moscow on 8 January 2023, at the age of 87.

Sergey Yastrzhembsky is married to his niece.

References

External links
 Шабанов о КПРФ за 20 лет

1935 births
2023 deaths
Russian chemists
Second convocation members of the State Duma (Russian Federation)
Third convocation members of the State Duma (Russian Federation)
Communist Party of the Soviet Union members
Communist Party of the Russian Federation members
Moscow State University alumni
Politicians from Moscow
Academic staff of Moscow State University